Yana Yazova (Bulgarian: Яна Язова) was the pen name of Lyuba Todorova Gancheva (Bulgarian: Люба Тодорова Ганчева) (1912 – August 1974), a Bulgarian intellectual and writer. Her name is also transcribed as Liuba Gantcheva.

Life 
She was born in Lom and received a Master's degree in Slavic philology from Sofia University in 1935. Gancheva also studied French philology at the Sorbonne. In 1940 she published a historical drama The Last of the Pagans and a novel The Captain. From 1942 to 1943, she co-edited the children's magazine Blok with Nikola Balabanov, brother of Prof. Alexander Balabanov, her mentor and lover. Gancheva married another man in 1943. Later in life, she was pressured to write poetry promoting communism but she instead chose to become a recluse.

Her poetry was translated into Esperanto, Czech, Serbian and Ukrainian. She travelled extensively in Europe and the Near East and wrote about her travels.

Her historical novel Alexander of Macedon, the trilogy Balkans and the anti-communist novel Salt Gulf were published after her death.

She was found murdered in her home in Sofia in 1974.

See also
List of unsolved murders

Selected works 
 Yazove, poetry (1931)
 Revolt, poetry (1934)
 Crosses, poetry (1935)
 Ana Dyulgerova, novel (1936)
 The Captain, novel (1940)
 Balkans, novel (1987-1989)
 Alexander of Macedon, novel (2002)
 Salt Gulf, novel (2003)

References 

1912 births
1974 deaths
20th-century pseudonymous writers
20th-century Bulgarian poets
20th-century Bulgarian women writers
20th-century Bulgarian novelists
Bulgarian historical fiction writers
Bulgarian women poets
Female murder victims
People from Lom, Bulgaria
Pseudonymous women writers
Unsolved murders in Bulgaria
1974 murders in Bulgaria